Tereza Szewieczková (born 4 May 1998) is a Czech football striker, currently playing for Slavia Praha in the Czech First Division. Szewieczková was voted talent of the year at the 2014 Czech Women's Footballer of the Year.

She was an Under 19 international.

International goals
Statistics accurate as of match played 4 Dec 2022.

References

External links
 

1998 births
Living people
Czech women's footballers
People from Havířov
Women's association football forwards
AC Sparta Praha (women) players
SK Slavia Praha (women) players
Czech Republic women's international footballers
Czech people of Polish descent
Czech Women's First League players
Sportspeople from the Moravian-Silesian Region